The Shelby Town Hall in Shelby, Montana is a former town hall building which was built in 1923.  It was listed on the National Register of Historic Places in 2006.  It is used by the Shelby Chamber of Commerce and as a Visitor Information Center.

The building was built in just two months in 1923, with expectation it would be the media headquarters for coverage of the 4th of July "World Heavyweight Championship Fight" between Jack Dempsey and Tommy Gibbons.

References

External links
Shelby Chamber of Commerce
 Asset Detail: Archived photo of the Shelby Town Hall from the National Register of Historic Places

City and town halls on the National Register of Historic Places in Montana
Government buildings completed in 1923
National Register of Historic Places in Toole County, Montana
1923 establishments in Montana
Bungalow architecture in Montana
Visitor centers in the United States
Boxing in Montana